Blessing Okardi (born 5 November 1988) is a football player from Nigeria, who played for Bayelsa United F.C. and currently plays for Famous All stars

Career
On 27 October 2006 he was on trial by KAA Gent. With Ocean Boys he captained their 2008 Nigerian FA Cup winning team, beating Gombe United in a penalty shootout on 5 July 2008. He moved to Lobi Stars in October 2009. He was banned for one year for his part in a referee attack in March 2010. The right midfielder left on 24 November 2012 after three years his club Lobi Stars and signed for Bayelsa United F.C.

International
At international level, he made two appearances for Nigeria in the 2007 FIFA U-20 World Cup, against Scotland and Costa Rica.

References

External links
Player Profile

1988 births
Living people
Nigerian footballers
Nigeria international footballers
Nigeria under-20 international footballers
Lobi Stars F.C. players
Association football midfielders
Gombe United F.C. players
Ocean Boys F.C. players
Bayelsa United F.C. players